Garden Island (Noongar: Meandup or Meeandip) is a narrow island about  long and  wide, lying about  off the Western Australian coast, to which it is linked by an artificial causeway and bridge.

Like Rottnest Island and Carnac Island, it is a limestone outcrop covered by a thin layer of sand accumulated during an era of lowered sea levels. The Noongar peoples tell of walking to these islands in their Dreamtime.

At the end of the last glacial period, the sea level rose, cutting the island off from the mainland. For the last seven thousand years, the island has existed in relative isolation.

The Royal Australian Navy's largest fleet base, Fleet Base West, also called HMAS Stirling, is on the shores of Careening Bay, on the southeastern section of Garden Island, facing Cockburn Sound.   people lived on the Garden Island base.

The entirety of Garden Island is included on the Commonwealth Heritage List for its natural values. Garden Island is home to a tammar wallaby population.

History

The island was marked but not named on Dutch maps in 1658, even though there were three Dutch ships in the area that year: the Waekende Boey under Captain S. Volckertszoon, the Elburg under Captain J. Peereboom and the Emeloort under Captain A. Joncke. However, it was outlined on the charts of the Southland, which were published after Willem de Vlamingh visited the region in 1697.

Jacques Felix Emmanuel, Baron Hamelin was the Captain of the Naturaliste, one of three French ships that visited in 1801 to 1803. He named the island "Ile Buache" after Jean Nicolas Buache, a marine cartographer in Paris. The island was renamed "Garden Island" in 1827 by Captain James Stirling, who "prepared a garden and released a cow, two ewes and three goats in an area of good pasture with good water supply." It has been widely believed that Stirling chose the name "Garden Island" because he planted a garden there, but Statham-Drew (2003) notes that he used the name well before anything was planted there. She argues that it was so named because the shelter that it provides to Cockburn Sound was reminiscent of the way that the Isle of Wight, then known locally as the "Garden Isle", shelters the waters off Portsmouth.

The first settlement of  people was named Sulphur Town. Sulphur Bay and Careening Bay were important anchorage and cargo disembarkation points for ships until 1897 when Fremantle's inner harbour was completed.

In 1907 Peet & Co (now Peet Limited) subdivided eight-three blocks at Careening Bay. After World War I it became a holiday resort with wooden cottages erected at the bay. During World War II, gun batteries were located on Garden Island. These were part of an integrated coastal defence system for Fremantle Harbour facilities.

The Challenger Battery was the first gun battery constructed on Garden Island in 1942. Two US-supplied mobile Canon de 155mm guns on Panama mount were installed to protect Garden Island, Cockburn Sound and the Challenger Passage. The battery was installed in early 1943 and operational by April. In the meantime, more permanent batteries were constructed on the island, which were completed in October 1943. The battery was withdrawn again in December 1944.

The biggest battery on Garden Island was the Scriven Battery, fitted with two breech-loading 9.2-inch MkX guns, similar to the Oliver Hill Battery on Rottnest Island. In 1943 building began on a complex of tunnels and rooms, included shell stores, magazines, pump chamber and powerhouse, plotting room and command post, and battery observation posts. However, the threat of attack receded as the battery was completed. Resources were allocated elsewhere, and the battery and its guns were placed in reserve. The battery was decommissioned in 1963 and the guns scrapped.

During World War II, Careening Bay Camp became a major training base for the secretive Services Reconnaissance Department (SRD), also commonly referred to as "Z Special Unit". The base was officially known as the Special Boat Section and was used to train operatives in the advanced use of folboat folding kayaks as well as top secret British midget submarines such as the "Motorised Submersible Canoe" ("Sleeping Beauty"), "Welman" and "Welfreighter" submarines. SRD Parties staging out of Careening Bay Camp were sent on clandestine missions into Japanese-occupied territory.

Following the war, Garden Island became a holiday resort again and the home of the RAN Reserve Fleet.

Naval Base

In 1966, a feasibility study began into establishment of a naval support facility on the island, which was endorsed by the Federal Government in 1969. Construction of the  Garden Island causeway began in 1971 and was completed in 1973. The facility was completed in 1978, and HMAS Stirling was formally commissioned as a unit of the Royal Australian Navy in the same year. Stirling, also referred to as Fleet Base West, was developed further under the Two-Ocean Policy to become the main naval base on the west coast of Australia.

, Stirling is home to five frigates and all submarines of the Australian Submarine Service, which is headquartered at the base. A Clearance Diving Team is also based at Stirling.

Since completion of the facility, public access to the island has been restricted to daylight hours. However,  public access is not granted to the public in general via the causeway unless entry is sponsored by the military. Access by sea is restricted to private boats using moorings, also under daylight curfew conditions. The Navy has undertaken various successful programmes for the removal of introduced animals; all native animals on the island are protected.

See also
List of islands of Perth, Western Australia

References

Further reading

External links

 Globalsecurity.org, 'Fleet Base'

Garden Island (Western Australia)
Commonwealth Heritage List places in Western Australia
Suburbs of Perth, Western Australia
Suburbs in the City of Rockingham